Pinoy Meets World is a Philippine television travel documentary show broadcast by GMA Network. Hosted by Paolo Bediones and Miriam Quiambao, it premiered on June 25, 2006. The show concluded on January 25, 2009.

Episodes

Accolades

References

External links
 

2006 Philippine television series debuts
2009 Philippine television series endings
Filipino-language television shows
GMA Network original programming
GMA Integrated News and Public Affairs shows
Philippine documentary television series
Philippine travel television series